The ISANGYUN Competition is an international music competition, held annually in Tongyeong, South Korea. It commemorates Isang Yun (1917–1995), a Korean composer who was born in Tongyeong and later settled in Germany. The competition was established in 2003 as the Gyeongnam International Music Competition, and renamed to ISANGYUN Competition in 2008. It consists of a three-year "cycle", where each year, or "edition", consists of a different instrument in the rotation: cello, piano, and violin.

History 
The competition has been organized by local governments and media companies in South Korea: Gyeongnam Province, the City of Tongyeong and MBC Gyeongnam. To remember Isang Yun, in 2003, the Governor of Gyeongnam Province requested the Tongyeong International Music Festival (통영국제음악제) Foundation to plan and organize an international competition. The foundation, initially chaired by Seong-Yawng Park, created a general prospectus of an annual instrumental competition to nurture international young players between 15 and 29 years old. The event would be held in the city where Yun was born, which was Tongyeong, and the competition dates would be scheduled to include November 3, the date of Yun's death in 1995. However, there were exceptions in the schedule for the years 2003, 2004, and 2009.

The first Gyeongnam International Music Competition was held in 2003. The organizers originally wanted different instrument disciplines. The first discipline selected was cello, since Yun was a famed cellist, and he had composed his first concerto for cello in 1975–76. The organizers then selected violin and piano, because those were the top two disciplines to present the highest quantity of international competitions, and because Yun wrote many works involving those two instruments. They also found that after one cycle of three editions, the winners had an opportunity to collaborate and play in piano trios.

In order to attract an international audience, the organizers wanted the Gyeongnam International Music Competition to be recognized by the World Federation of International Music Competitions (WFIMC). In accordance with WFIMC statutes, the event had to show two editions of success, which it did in 2003 and 2004. The next year, the foundation submitted an application to the WFIMC. In 2006, following a vote held by the federation's general assembly in Geneva, the WFIMC accepted the Gyeongnam International Music Competition as a member competition, which made it the first music competition in South Korea to receive such an honor.

The organizers originally wanted to name the event after Isang Yun, however, the Yun family would not permit it; they were not convinced that the event was sustainable or comparable to other international competitions. The organizers continued to persuade the family, and after demonstrating the event's success, the Yun family eventually consented. The name change was ratified in 2008 by the WFIMC's general assembly in Tbilisi, Georgia. The WFIMC also stipulated that the name "Isang Yun" be titled in all capital letters.

Editions 
As of 2011, the competition has completed nine editions and three cycles, rotating among disciplines of cello, violin and piano. The 2012 competition will begin the fourth cycle and tenth edition.

All competitions have been held at the Main Hall of the Tongyeong Arts Center.

Schedule

Preliminary stage
As part of the WFIMC statutes, the competition is available to all nationalities.

Months before the event, there is a preliminary stage where the applicants submit a written application, and audio/video material showing his or her performance of a piece from a selected list of artists. A preliminary jury, one of which is a South Korea representative from the regular jury, reviews the applications, and selects "approximately 25 or more" people to participate in the event. The participants then submit their repertoires by mid-September.

First stage
The first stage lasts two days. The participant plays three pieces with the following constraints: 
 One piece is from a selection of works from a list of artists.
 One piece is from a selection of works from Isang Yun.
 One piece is of the performer's choice.
 The total duration of the performances has a time limit.
 The pieces cannot be from the preliminary stage.

A day is placed between the first and second stage. Competitors are notified on whether they advance in the competition.

Second stage
The second stage lasts two days. The participant plays three pieces with the following constraints:
 One piece is a complete sonata from a selection of works from a list of artists.
 One piece is a complete sonata from a selection of works from Yun, or a contemporary (composed in 1950 or later) artist.
 One piece is of the performer's choice, with restrictions that it cannot be from a composer that has been presented before.  A preliminary stage composer may be selected, but a different piece must be chosen. Piano accompaniment is allowed for some pieces.
 The total duration of the performances also has a time limit.
 The best performer of Yun's piece in this stage wins the Isang Yun Special Award.

A day is placed between the second and final stage.  Competitors are notified on who is selected as a finalist. In previous competitions there were five finalists, all considered "Prize Winners". Between 2012 and 2013, only four prize winners were awarded. Starting from 2014, there were only three.

Final stage
The final stage lasts one day. The finalists choose from a list of concertos and play the pieces with a full orchestra. As with the other stages, there is a time limit, and the pieces cannot be from previous stages.

The day after the final stage is the Winners Concert.

The competition originally awarded cash prizes in the currency of US Dollars, but starting with the 2012 Edition, the cash prizes are awarded in Korean Won (KRW).

Prizes 
The following are the prizes from the 2014 competition:

Adjustments
 Income taxes are applied to the cash prize amount acccoing to South Korean tax laws.
 Except for 1st Prize, ties may be awarded, where the prize money for that ranking and the next below ranking are averaged and awarded to the tied Winners.

The winners also have to do concerts and CD recordings, as well as return visits to perform at Tongyeong.

List of Jury Members 
The judging for the first, second, and final stage consists of nine "jury" members, two of whom are from South Korea, the host country. Complying with WFIMC statutes, the seven other members must come from other countries. One of the two South Korean jurors participates in the preliminary stage.

Results

Prize Winners 
The following table is a list of the finalists (aka Prize Winners) for each competition. Starting in 2012, there will only be four finalists.

Isang Yun Special Prize
This award is given to the best performer of Isang Yun's piece during the second stage. It was originally named "Special Prize" in 2006, but Yun's name was added in 2007 to distinguish between the two special prizes.

Seong-Yawng Park Special Prize
Starting in 2007, the Seong-Yawng Park Special Prize is given to the most promising young Korean performer from the second and final stages. It is sponsored by the Kumho Asiana Group.

See also 
 
List of music festivals in South Korea 
List of classical music festivals
 World Federation of International Music Competitions
 List of classical music competitions
 Tongyeong International Music Festival Foundation

References

External links

Music festivals established in 2003
Classical music festivals in South Korea
Classical music in South Korea
Competitions in South Korea
Music festivals in South Korea
Annual events in South Korea
Music competitions in South Korea